The following is an episode list for the television series Web Therapy. The series stars Lisa Kudrow as Fiona Wallice, a therapist who has conceived of a new form of therapy: the titular "web therapy."

Series overview

Episodes

Season 1 (2011)

Season 2 (2012)

Season 3 (2013)

Season 4 (2014–15)

References

External links
 
 

Web Therapy